Cambria is a community within the Town of Drumheller, Alberta, Canada. It was previously a hamlet within the former Municipal District (MD) of Badlands No. 7 prior to the MD's amalgamation with the former City of Drumheller on January 1, 1998.

The community is within Census Division No. 5 and in the federal riding of Crowfoot.

See also 
List of communities in Alberta

References 

Drumheller
Former hamlets in Alberta
Populated places disestablished in 1998